Michael Varhol is a screenwriter and film producer. He is most notable for his work on Pee-wee's Big Adventure and The Big Picture. His "Central Park: the Soul of New York City" won the photography competition at the 2018 Big Apple Film Festival. He has been working on documenting the street art and street scene on Melrose Avenue in Los Angeles for over a decade.

External links

American male screenwriters
Living people
Year of birth missing (living people)
Place of birth missing (living people)
American film producers